Alvarenga is a Brazilian municipality in the state of Minas Gerais. As of 2020 its population is estimated to be 3,844.

References

Municipalities in Minas Gerais